Colorow Mountain is a summit in the Indian Valley area in Rio Blanco County, Colorado. The Colorow Mountain State Wildlife Area is located on the mountain.

The Colorow Mountain State Wildlife Area is located near White River City and is north of Rio Blanco Lake and State Highway 64. There is camping, hunting, hiking, horseback riding, and wildlife viewing on the 1500-acre park. It has access to some Bureau of Land Management areas north of the wildlife area. The wildlife area opened in 2013 following a land swap between ExxonMobil and Colorado Parks and Wildlife to protect wildlife.

References

Further reading

External links
 Colorow Mountain State Wildlife Area, Colorado Parks and Wildlife

Mountains of Rio Blanco County, Colorado
Wildlife management areas of Colorado